This is a list of monuments in Kapilvastu District, Nepal as officially recognized by and available through the website of the Department of Archaeology, Nepal.
Kapilvastu is a district of Lumbini Province and is located in south-western Nepal.

List of monuments

|}

See also 
 List of monuments in Lumbini Province
 List of monuments in Nepal

References 

Kapilvastu